Roxton (officially Le Canton de Roxton) is a township municipality (municipalité de canton) in the Acton Regional County Municipality, in the province of Quebec, Canada. The population as of the Canada 2011 Census was 1,093.

Roxton entirely surrounds the village of Roxton Falls. Roxton and Roxton Falls are legally distinct municipalities (with separate elected officials), but the administration of both is physically located in the village of Roxton Falls.

Roxton has only a few hundred fewer people than Roxton Falls, but is spread out over a much greater geographic area.

Demographics 

Population trend:

Mother tongue language (2006)

See also
List of township municipalities in Quebec

References

External links

Regional County Municipality of Acton
Official Site - Roxton Canton (Roxton Township)
Official Site - Roxton Falls

Township municipalities in Quebec
Incorporated places in Acton Regional County Municipality